Soniya Dabir (born 17 July 1980) is a cricketer who has played in 4 ODIs and 13 T20Is for India. She represents Maharashtra in India's domestic league.

References

1980 births
Cricketers from Pune
India women One Day International cricketers
India women Twenty20 International cricketers
Indian women cricketers
Karnataka women cricketers
Living people
Maharashtra women cricketers
Sportswomen from Maharashtra
West Zone women cricketers